The New Jersey State Interscholastic Athletic Association Tournament of Champions (NJSIAA TOC) is the sports tournament for New Jersey high schools that determines which high school will be crowned as the #1 overall team in the state for each sport. It takes the state champions from each group (see external links) and matches them up against one another, regardless of school size or enrollment status (public or private), to determine the top overall team in New Jersey.

Certain steps must be taken to qualify for the TOC. First, a high school must qualify for the state playoffs by accumulating a .500 or better win percentage for the season before the cut-off date. This will enter them into the sectional tournament of the state playoffs. Next, the team must win all of its playoff games through the sectionals and into the state tournament. Only when a high school wins the state championship for their respective group will they be able to participate in the Tournament of Champions.

Not all high school sports in New Jersey offer a TOC. For boys, the tournament is offered in basketball (established in 1989), cross country, lacrosse (since 2004), tennis, and indoor / outdoor track. No soccer or football TOCs exist due to the length of those seasons which often conflict with the start of the winter sports. For girls, the sports are basketball (since 1989), cross country, field hockey (since 2006), lacrosse (2007), softball (2017), tennis, indoor / outdoor track, and volleyball. 

For some sports, there are no group championships. All schools, public and non-public, compete for the state championship. For the boys it is bowling, fencing, golf, and volleyball. For the girls it is bowling, fencing, golf, and gymnastics.

In November 2021, the NJSIAA's executive committee passed a first reading that would end the Tournament of Champions starting in the 2022-23 season, as part of an effort to allow teams greater ability to schedule games and to allow schools and teams to end their season as winners.

References

External links
NJSIAA official website

High school sports associations in the United States
High school sports in New Jersey
High school basketball competitions in the United States
Recurring sporting events established in 1989